Fanny K. Hopeau (April 21, 1945 – July 27, 2019) was an American volleyball player. She played for the United States national team at the 1967 Pan American Games and the 1968 Summer Olympics. She was born in Honolulu, Hawaii.

References

1945 births
2019 deaths
Olympic volleyball players of the United States
Volleyball players at the 1968 Summer Olympics
Volleyball players at the 1967 Pan American Games
Pan American Games gold medalists for the United States
Volleyball players from Honolulu
American women's volleyball players
Pan American Games medalists in volleyball
Medalists at the 1967 Pan American Games
21st-century American women